Hotel Arctic is the world's most northerly 4-star hotel, with a 5 star conference Centre. It is located on the edge of the Ilulissat Icefjord, a UNESCO World Heritage Site owned by Air Greenland. The hotel was built shortly after the airport was opened in 1984 to accommodate passengers.

Hotel Arctic has 76 rooms, 9 suites and 5 aluminium "Igloos" built on the edge of the coast. The hotel has facilities that may accommodate up to 120 people.

The restaurant Ulo serves Greenlandic cuisine and is recognized as one of the very best in the whole country. The restaurant serves as much local food as possible; with most of it being produced themselves. Additional food and beverage options are Café Ferdinand and the Ice Bar.

The hotel is amongst the leading conference centres in Scandinavia and the North. 

Since September 1, 2013, the hotel is 100 percent -neutral.

All year round, there are 60 employees present and in the peak season, this figure increases to about 70.

See also
 List of hotels in Greenland

References

Companies based in Ilulissat
Hotels established in 1984
Hotel buildings completed in 1984
Hotels in Greenland
Ilulissat